The ATI Soundblaster HPSS (High-Power Speaker Station) is an electronic outdoor warning siren manufactured by Acoustic Technology, Inc (ATI) that is used to alert citizens of tornadoes, hurricanes, severe thunderstorms, fires and so on. The recent HPSS systems use high-powered electronic speakers, which can be independently arranged to provide directional or omnidirectional coverage, depending on installation. The HPSS16 have 4 speakers and the  HPSS32 have 8 speakers. They can also be used as public announcement (PA) systems, and can play a number of programmed tones. Options include solar-powered operation pre-recorded voice messages. ATI also sold rotational units of the HPSS16, and HPSS32, called the "HPSS16R" and "HPSS32R", that are now discontinued.

Areas known to use HPSS systems
 San Francisco, California - This system is unique, in that it features the sound of the decommissioned Federal Signal STL-10 sirens that the HPSS units replaced
 Casitas Dam, Ventura, California (This system is unique, in that they look like the Federal Signal Directional Speaker Array (DSA) sirens), but can have 7–8 speakers per stack, and gray caps on the speaker cones).
 Indian Point Energy Center, New York
 Owasso, Oklahoma - System of sixteen HPSS32 sirens.
 Israel has 3100 sirens as a part of its warning system, and 300 of them are HPSS32 sirens.
 Sedgwick County, Kansas and the City of Wichita 27 ATI HPSS32 units are part of the system's 150 sirens.
 Forsyth County, Georgia has mostly ATI hpss16r plus in 2012 added ATI HPSS32 this system back in 2008 replaced some whelens 28X9
 Norcross, Georgia Has 10 ATI HPSS 16s that replaced Whelen 2805s 2905s and one 2804. All were directly replaced in 2022
 Frisco, Texas ATI HPSS32 units.
 Fort Riley, Kansas 2 ATI HPSS16 units.
 Del City, Oklahoma 8 ATI HPSS16 units. 
 Malmstrom AFB, MT 6 ATI HPSS16 units
 Pasig, Philippines has 2 ATI HPSS32 unit.
 Battle Creek, Michigan has four rotating ATI HPSS16R units. They run 575 Hz alert for tornado warnings.
 Menominee, Michigan has three rotating ATI HPSS32R units
 Pensacola NAS, Florida, ATI HPSS16 (mostly), the sirens on Pensacola's navy base are mostly used for tornado warnings and they play the colors in the morning and evening. When a warning is issued, these siren sound ATI's version of wail signal during tornado warnings. Attack signal or other signals have not been used yet. These siren are silently tested on Fridays. 
 University of West Florida In Pensacola, Florida, ATI HPSS16 sirens here are used for chemical spills, weather warnings, lock downs, and they play a daily Westminster chime tone at noon.
 Arnold, Missouri 7 ATI HPSS32 units which replace the old Whelen WPS 3016 Sirens.
 Ketchikan, Alaska maintains a system of 3 ATI HPSS32 units which are tested audibly on the 15th of the month at noon. These sirens are used to warn for tsunamis or in the event of a dam failure.
 Hudson County, New Jersey has an unknown number of HPSS sirens. They are supposedly used for nuclear emergencies.* 
 Chile, Antofagasta has also an unknown number of HPSS-32 sirens. They are used to warn about tsunamis and fires.
 Sarnia, Ontario and the surrounding communities use a system of 22 ATI HPSS-32 units to warn of chemical plant spills and accidents, as well as severe weather. They are tested every Monday at 12:30PM. These replaced an older system of ACA Alertronic AL-6000R sirens.

References

External links
Corporate web page

Sirens